Prionoptera serraoides is a species of moth of the family Noctuidae first described by Paul Dognin in 1892. It is found in Ecuador.

References

Catocalinae